Orectospira is a genus of sea snails, marine gastropod mollusks in the family Turritellidae.

Species
Species within the genus Orectospira include:
 Orectospira babelica (Dall, 1907)
 Orectospira shikoensis (Yokoyama, 1928)
 Orectospira tectiformis (Watson, 1880)
Species brought into synonymy
 Orectospira fusca Okutani & Habe, 1981: synonym of Mathilda fusca (Okutani & Habe, 1981)

References

Turritellidae